León Arena, also known locally as Plaza de Toros de León is an arena in León, Spain It is primarily used for musical concerts and bullfighting, however it has been used for handball and basketball too. The arena opened in  1948 as a bullring, but in 2000 it was covered, becoming a modern indoor arena. It has a seating capacity for 10,000 people.

See also
 List of indoor arenas in Spain

References

External links

Indoor arenas in Spain
Basketball venues in Spain
Bullrings in Spain
Sports venues in Castile and León